Feitiço may refer to:

Feitiço - Portuguese word for Fetishism
Feitiço - Footballer